Tamara Khanum (1906–1991) was an Armenian dancer, known for being one of the first women in Uzbekistan to dance on stage without a paranja. She was a colleague of ill-fated Uzbek dancer Nurkhon Yuldasheva, who was murdered in an honor killing for taking off her veil onstage.

Early life 
Khanum was born as Tamara Artyomovna Petrosyan to an Armenian family in the Uzbek city of Margilan in the Ferghana valley of Central Asia, then part of the Russian Empire. Khanum showed interest in dance as a child, singing and dancing to Uzbek folk songs. In 1919 she joined the mobile theater troupe of the Turkestan Front led by Hamza Niyazi.

Career 
In 1921 she joined the Tashkent Russian opera and ballet theater named after Yakov Sverdlov, after which she joined the Tashkent Ballet troupe in 1922. In 1924 she graduated from the Central Technical School of Theater Arts in Moscow.

Khanum's dancing had a profound effect on American writer Langston Hughes, who wrote a 1934 article, "Tamara Khanum: Soviet Asia's Greatest Dancer," which praised Khanum for her performances and for breaking cultural taboos by appearing on stage.

Legacy 
The house museum of Tamara Khanum was created in 1994.

See also
Hujum
Nurkhon Yuldashkhojayeva
Tursunoy Saidazimova

References

1906 births
1991 deaths
20th-century ballet dancers
20th-century Uzbekistani actresses
20th-century Uzbekistani women singers
People from Fergana
Communist Party of the Soviet Union members
Russian Academy of Theatre Arts alumni
People's Artists of Uzbekistan
People's Artists of the USSR
Stalin Prize winners
Recipients of the Order of Lenin
Recipients of the Order of the Red Banner of Labour
Uzbekistani people of Armenian descent
Uzbekistani choreographers
Uzbekistani dancers
Uzbekistani stage actors
Soviet ballerinas
Soviet choreographers
Soviet female dancers

Soviet women singers
Women choreographers